George Frederick Baskerville Mortimer (18 July 1816 – 1854) was an English first-class cricketer.

Mortimer was born at Trowbridge, Wiltshire in July 1816, one of twenty children of Edward Horlock Mortimer and his wife, Frances Lardner. He made one appearance in first-class cricket for the Surrey Club against the Marylebone Cricket Club at Lord's in 1852. He was not called upon to bat or bowl during the match. He died at some point in 1854.

References

External links

1816 births
1854 deaths
People from Trowbridge
English cricketers of 1826 to 1863
Surrey Club cricketers